Meaghan Oppenheimer (born 1986) is an American television and movie screenwriter, producer, actress, and voice artist.

Early life and education
Meaghan Oppenheimer grew up in Tulsa, Oklahoma, and was a former child actor, working in various regional theatre productions and television shows. She graduated from Holland Hall, and then New York University—Tisch School of the Arts in 2009.  Afterward, she relocated to Los Angeles to begin a screenwriting career.

Career
In 2010, Oppenheimer wrote and starred in Hot Mess, a film about two roommates that become friends-with-benefits. She has written screenplays for a number of projects, including Fear the Walking Dead  She co-wrote the screenplay for 2015's We Are Your Friends with film maker Max Joseph.

In December of that year, ABC announced that Reese Witherspoon would be producing a new drama series for TV written by Oppenheimer, with the working title Please Don't Go, about the personal and professional life of a ruthless divorce attorney in Dallas whose past continues to haunt her. In March 2016, ABC announced that Penelope Ann Miller had been cast opposite T. R. Knight in the project that in 2016 was released as Broken—a series pilot that halted production after the first episode aired.

In 2018, Oppenheimer penned the script for the Facebook Watch TV show, Queen America. She is also notable for her distinctive voice.

She adapted Carola Lovering's Tell Me Lies for Hulu that was filmed and released in 2022. She also served as co-executive producer and showrunner of the series, which starred Grace Van Patten and Jackson White.

Personal life
Oppenheimer has been married to actor Tom Ellis since June 1, 2019. Oppenheimer is the stepmother to his three children that Ellis fathered from previous relationships.

Screenwriting credits

Acting credits

Accolades and reception
Oppenheimer's un-filmed screenplay, The Remains, was selected for the 2013 Black List—a yearly list of "...best Screenplays not yet made into films..." Dana Feldman of Forbes wrote while reviewing Tell Me Lies: "...[the production] received a straight-to-series order, and we definitely need another season..."  The Her Voice podcast hosts exclaimed: "From script to screen, she is clear in her purpose and powerful in her ability to manifest the right people and circumstances to be able to develop female driven stories about mental health, relationships, and generational trauma." Keely Weiss of Elle Magazine writes: "...showrunner Meaghan Oppenheimer pulled [the adaptation] off with aplomb, turning Lovering’s novel into a visually propulsive show populated by a rich cast of characters, all while preserving the core themes of the book.

Notes

References 

Living people
21st-century American writers
21st-century American actresses
1986 births
21st-century American women writers
American women screenwriters
Writers from Tulsa, Oklahoma
Screenwriters from Oklahoma
American television writers
American women television writers
Tisch School of the Arts alumni
American child actors